Club Deportivo Laferrere is a football club from the homonymous district of La Matanza Partido, Greater Buenos Aires. The team currently plays in Primera C, the regionalized fourth division of the Argentine football league system.

Laferrere was founded in 1956 and registered with AFA in 1978. The team has spent most of its time playing in the third and fourth divisions. Nevertheless, Laferrere had a brief spell in the Primera B Nacional (the second division) between 1990 and 1995. Its best league position to date was 15th. in the 2nd division, which it achieved in 1991 and 1993.

Current squad

Titles
Primera C (2): 1986–87, 2001–02

External links

 
 

Association football clubs established in 1956
Football clubs in Buenos Aires Province
1956 establishments in Argentina